Medical officer may refer to:

 Physician, a medical doctor in general
 Medical Officer (AYUSH), the title used in India
 Medical Officer for Health, the senior government official of a health department